Is Your Love Big Enough? is the debut studio album by English singer-songwriter Lianne La Havas. It was released in the United Kingdom on July 9, 2012, through Warner Bros. The album peaked at number 4 on the UK Albums Chart.

The album was nominated for the 2012 Mercury Prize and 2013 Ivor Novello Awards.

Background
Whilst attending sixth-form in Croydon, a friend of La Havas', the singer and songwriter Allan Rose (who had attended the Brit School), introduced her to other musicians who would assist La Havas in the recording of her first demos. Through that same friend La Havas was also introduced to British singer Paloma Faith; she later sang backing vocals on tour for Faith. La Havas was co-writer and performer in The Paris Parade alongside Christian Pinchbeck (who designed the artwork for Lost & Found and is also now part of the duo Memphis Industries duo Elephant); their short-lived career would kick off La Havas' career in commercial music. In 2010, Lianne signed to Warner Bros. Records, spending two years developing her songwriting skills before releasing any music publicly.

Her first EP Lost & Found was released on October 21, 2011, on the Labour of Love label, featuring Willy Mason on the opening track "No Room For Doubt". That same month, La Havas released the live EP Live From LA, which was made available for free download on her website. La Havas made her television debut on October 21, 2011, broadcast of BBC Two's Later… with Jools Holland, a programme that also featured Wisconsin folk band Bon Iver; soon after this on October 25, 2011, it was announced that La Havas would be the supporting act for Bon Iver's December 2011 North American tour.

Release and promotion

Her official debut single "Lost & Found" was released in the UK on April 30, 2012, and her debut album, was released on July 9, 2012, on Warner Brothers. "Forget" was released as the second single from the album on December 30, 2011. "Lost & Found" was released as the third single from the album on April 27, 2012. "Is Your Love Big Enough?" was released as the fourth single from the album on May 22, 2012. The song was heavily contributed to the 2014 documentary film The Distortion of Sound, which features Lianne and her live performance of the single. "Age" was released as the fifth single from the album on December 3, 2012.

At the end of 2012, Is Your Love Big Enough? was named iTunes Album of the Year.
On September 24, 2012, September La Havas supported Alicia Keys at MTV 'Crashes' Manchester, a live performance in front of 1,000 people in Manchester Cathedral, which was broadcast in 164 countries. On December 31, 2012, she appeared on BBC Two's New Year's Eve show Jools' Annual Hootenanny singing Cow Cow Boogie. On June 9, 2013, La Havas played at the RockNess music festival in Inverness, Scotland, and on June 30, 2013, La Havas performed at the Glastonbury Festival 2013. La Havas also performed at the Isle of Wight Festival in June 2013.

Critical reception

At Metacritic, which assigns a normalized rating out of 100 to reviews from mainstream critics, the album received an average score of 75, based on 15 reviews, which indicates "Generally favorable reviews". Gaffa listed Is Your Love Big Enough? the 30th best album of 2012 by a non-Danish artist.

Track listing

 The enhanced CD gives access to videos of an exclusive track-by-track interview.
 All writing and production credits have been taken from Is Your Love Big Enough? booklet.

Release formats
Is Your Love Big Enough? (Standard edition)
 Standard 12 tracks

Is Your Love Big Enough? (Deluxe edition)
 Standard 12 tracks
 Bonus 4 live tracks
 2 posters
 12-page booklet
 3-panel softpack case

Is Your Love Big Enough? (Limited vinyl edition)
 MP3 download
 Standard 12 tracks
 Bonus 7" vinyl featuring two bonus tracks
 Two exclusive 12" artcard prints

Is Your Love Big Enough? (iTunes Festival)
 Standard 12 tracks
 3 bonus videos, live from the iTunes Festival 2012

Charts

Certifications

Release history

References

External links 
 Lianne La Havas: Is Your Love Big Enough? – review -The Guardian

2012 debut albums
Warner Records albums
Lianne La Havas albums